74th NYFCC Awards
January 5, 2009

Best Picture: 
Milk

The 74th New York Film Critics Circle Awards, honoring the best in film for 2008, were announced on 10 December 2008 and presented on 5 January 2009.

Winners

Best Actor

1. Sean Penn – Milk
2. Mickey Rourke – The Wrestler
3. Clint Eastwood – Gran Torino

Best Actress

1. Sally Hawkins – Happy-Go-Lucky
2. Melissa Leo – Frozen River
3. Anne Hathaway – Rachel Getting Married
3. Kate Winslet – Revolutionary Road

Best Animated Film

1. WALL-E
2. Waltz with Bashir (Vals Im Bashir)

Best Cinematography

1. Anthony Dod Mantle – Slumdog Millionaire
2. Claudio Miranda – The Curious Case of Benjamin Button
3. Wally Pfister – The Dark Knight

Best Director

1. Mike Leigh – Happy-Go-Lucky
2. Danny Boyle – Slumdog Millionaire
3. David Fincher – The Curious Case of Benjamin Button

Best Film

1. Milk
2. Rachel Getting Married
3. Happy-Go-Lucky
3. Slumdog Millionaire

Best First Film

1. Courtney Hunt – Frozen River
2. Lance Hammer – Ballast
3. Joachim Trier – Reprise

Best Foreign Language Film

1. 4 Months, 3 Weeks and 2 Days (4 luni, 3 saptamani si 2 zile) • Romania
2. A Christmas Tale (Un conte de Noël) • France
3. The Class (Entre les murs) • France

Best Non-Fiction Film

1. Man on Wire
2. Waltz with Bashir (Vals Im Bashir)
3. Trouble the Water

Best Screenplay

1. Jenny Lumet – Rachel Getting Married
2. Mike Leigh – Happy-Go-Lucky
3. Robert D. Siegel – The Wrestler

Best Supporting Actor

1. Josh Brolin – Milk
2. Heath Ledger – The Dark Knight
3. Robert Downey Jr. – Tropic Thunder

Best Supporting Actress

1. Penélope Cruz – Vicky Cristina Barcelona
2. Viola Davis – Doubt
3. Rosemarie DeWitt – Rachel Getting Married
3. Debra Winger – Rachel Getting Married

References

External links
 2008 Awards

2008
New York Film Critics Circle Awards
2008 in American cinema
2008 awards in the United States
2008 in New York City